Geojedonia is a Gram-negative, rod-shaped and non-motile genus of bacteria from the family of Flavobacteriaceae with one known species (Geojedonia litorea). Geojedonia litorea has been isolated from seawater from a seaweed farm from the South Sea from Korea.

References

Flavobacteria
Bacteria genera
Monotypic bacteria genera
Taxa described in 2013